Sylvie Desrosiers (born August 28, 1954) is a Canadian writer living in Quebec.

She was born in Montreal and received a BA in visual arts from the Université de Montréal. Desrosiers contributed to the Quebec humour magazine Croc. In 1987, she published La patte dans le sac which became the first of 18 novels in the Notdog series.

With Sylvie Pilon, she wrote the script for the film Red Nose (Nez rouge). Also, she was scriptwriter for the 2006 film Duo.

Desrosiers lives in Longueuil.

Selected works 
 Le long silence (1996), finalist for a Governor General's literary Award
 Bonne nuit, bon rêves, pas de puces, pas de punaises, novel (1998)
 Jeu de l'oie. Petite histoire vraie d'une cancer, autobiographical (2003)
 L'Héritage de la pirate, teen novel (2005)
 Les trois lieues, teen fiction (2008), received the Governor General's Award for French-language children's literature

References

External links 
 

1954 births
Living people
Canadian women screenwriters
Canadian novelists in French
Governor General's Award-winning children's writers
Writers from Montreal
Canadian screenwriters in French
Canadian women novelists
20th-century Canadian novelists
21st-century Canadian novelists
21st-century Canadian screenwriters
20th-century Canadian women
Canadian children's writers in French
Canadian women children's writers